Anhelina Serhiyivna Kalinina (born 7 February 1997) is a Ukrainian professional tennis player. Kalinina has won one singles title on the WTA Challenger Tour as well as 15 singles titles and three doubles titles on the ITF Circuit. On 30 January 2023, she reached her career-high singles ranking of world No. 31. Also on 30 January 2023, she peaked at No. 175 in the WTA doubles rankings. In June 2022, she became the No. 1 Ukrainian tennis player.

Juniors
In 2014, Kalinina partnering with Elizaveta Kulichkova won the girls' doubles tournament at the Australian Open, defeating Katie Boulter and Ivana Jorović in the final. Later that year, she reached the final of the Junior US Open, losing to Marie Bouzková in straight sets.

Professional career

2018: Grand Slam debut
At the 2018 US Open (tennis), Kalinina had her main-draw debut in a Grand Slam singles tournament, after winning three matches in the qualifying. She defeated Elena-Gabriela Ruse in the first qualifying round, Tereza Martincová in round two, and finally Jaimee Fourlis, also in straight sets, and went on to win a Grand Slam match by beating Kathinka von Deichmann in three sets but then lost in the second round to Sloane Stephens.

2021: French Open second round, first WTA final, and top 100 debut
At the French Open, she reached the second round as a qualifier, defeating 26th seed and three-times Grand Slam champion Angelique Kerber.

Although Kalinina fell in the last round of the Wimbledon qualifying, she won the $60k Montpellier and $100k Contrexéville trophies over the next two weeks to take her 2021 ITF title haul to four. With a record for the 2021 season of 32–7, she moved up 30 ranking spots from world No. 125 to No. 95.

2022: Maiden WTA 1000 quarterfinal, top 35 & Ukrainian No. 1
She made her debut in the top 50 at world No. 49, on 17 January 2022.

After reaching the round of 16 at the Miami Open before retiring hurt to 16th seed Jessica Pegula, Kalinina reached a new career-high ranking of world No. 42 and later in June reached No. 34. As a result, she became the No. 1 Ukrainian tennis player ahead of Elina Svitolina.

At the Eastbourne International, she defeated world No. 5 and third seed, Maria Sakkari, in the second round.

2023: Australian Open third round, top 30
At the Dubai Championships, she defeated 10th seed and top-20 player Veronika Kudermetova in the first round for her second top-20 win of the season, following her win at the Australian Open against 15th seed Petra Kvitová and sixth in total. She than won over compatriot Dayana Yastremska to reach the round of 16.

Performance timelines

Only main-draw results in WTA Tour, Grand Slam tournaments, Fed Cup/Billie Jean King Cup and Olympic Games are included in win–loss records.

Singles
Current after the 2023 Dubai Open.

Doubles

WTA career finals

Singles: 1 (runner-up)

WTA Challenger finals

Singles: 1 (title)

Junior Grand Slam tournament finals

Girls' singles: 1 (runner–up)

Girls' doubles: 2 (1 title, 1 runner–up)

ITF Circuit finals

Singles: 24 (15 titles, 9 runner-ups)

Doubles: 6 (3 titles, 3 runner-ups)

WTA Tour career earnings

Career Grand Slam statistics

Seedings
The tournaments won by Kalinina are in boldface, and advanced into finals by Kalinina are in italics.

Best Grand Slam results details

Head-to-head records

Record against top 10 players
Kalinina's record against players who have been ranked in the top 10:

Top 10 wins

Notes

References

External links

 
 

1997 births
Living people
People from Nova Kakhovka
Ukrainian female tennis players
Australian Open (tennis) junior champions
Grand Slam (tennis) champions in girls' doubles
Tennis players at the 2014 Summer Youth Olympics
Youth Olympic gold medalists for Ukraine
Sportspeople from Kherson Oblast
21st-century Ukrainian women